Krzysztof Wybieralski (born 1 February 1972 in Poznań) is a Polish former field hockey player who competed in the 2000 Summer Olympics.

He is brother of Łukasz Wybieralski; son of Józef Wybieralski; nephew of Jerzy Wybieralski.

References

External links

1972 births
Living people
Polish male field hockey players
Olympic field hockey players of Poland
1998 Men's Hockey World Cup players
Field hockey players at the 2000 Summer Olympics
Sportspeople from Poznań